The Penser Joch (2211 m) is a high mountain pass in South Tyrol, northern Italy, near the Jaufenpass. It connects Bolzano via the Sarntal and with Sterzing in the Wipptal. It is the most direct road between Innsbruck and Bolzano. It is traversed by the SS 508 highway, which has a maximum grade of 13 percent. There is a restaurant at the summit. Although, it has been widened repeatedly in recent years, the road is still rather narrow.

See also
 List of highest paved roads in Europe
 List of mountain passes

External links 

Mountain passes of the Alps
Mountain passes of South Tyrol